Acacia adnata is a shrub of the genus Acacia and the subgenus Plurinerves that is native to Western Australia.

Description
The patent, oblong phyllodes have a subquadrate or oblong-elliptic shape that is asymmetric.

Taxonomy
The species was first formally described by the botanist Ferdinand von Mueller in 1882 as part of the work Remarks on Australian Acacias as published in Australasian Chemist and Druggist. It was reclassified as Racosperma adnatum in 2003 then transferred back genus Acacia in 2006.

Distribution
It is endemic to a small area around the Irwin River in the Mid West region of Western Australia.

See also
 List of Acacia species

References

adnata
Acacias of Western Australia
Plants described in 1882
Taxa named by Ferdinand von Mueller